Nina Ricci Alcantara Ynares-Chiongbian (born October 19, 1970) is a Filipina businesswoman and politician serving as governor of Rizal, Philippines since 2022. Prior to joining politics, she served as a member of the Board of Directors of Manila Hotel and a member of the Board of Trustees of Government Service Insurance System (GSIS) until her resignation in 2021. She is the eldest daughter of the former governors Casimiro "Ito" Ynares Jr. and Rebecca "Nini" Alcantara Ynares and the sister of former governor and Antipolo Mayor Casimiro "Jun" Ynares III.

Personal life
She was married to James Chiongbian II, member of Chiongbian political dynasty in the province of Sarangani.

References

1970 births
Living people
Governors of Rizal
21st-century Filipino businesspeople
Nationalist People's Coalition politicians
Women provincial governors of the Philippines
De La Salle University alumni